Guillermo Fernández Vara (Olivenza, 1958) is a Spanish politician from the Spanish Socialist Workers' Party who has been the President of the Autonomous Government of Extremadura since 2015. He previously served as the President of Extremadura from 2007 to 2011. Fernández had also previously served as Minister for Health (1995 to 1996) and Social Security (1996 to 1999) in Extremaduran autonomous governments.

He studied medicine at the University of Córdoba.

References

1958 births
Living people
Presidents of the Regional Government of Extremadura
People from Olivenza
Politicians from Extremadura
Spanish Socialist Workers' Party politicians
University of Córdoba (Spain) alumni
Members of the 6th Assembly of Extremadura
Members of the 7th Assembly of Extremadura
Members of the 8th Assembly of Extremadura
Members of the 9th Assembly of Extremadura
Members of the 10th Assembly of Extremadura